Andrea Suma (13?? – 14??) was an Albanian prelate of the Roman Catholic Church.

Life 
A member of the noble Suma family he was born in Shkodër during the second half of the 14th century. In 1405 he was ordained as bishop of the Diocese of Lezhë, a post in which he served until 1426, when he became Bishop of Arbanum. After the establishment of the League of Lezhë he became an ambassador of Skanderbeg and the representative of the Roman Curia in Albania.

Suma is also the League's first treasurer to be recorded in historical documents. As such in March 1452 he received 4893 ducats from representatives of Nicholas V in Ragusa as part of the papal aid during the Ottoman-Albanian wars.

Sources 

14th-century Albanian people
15th-century Albanian Roman Catholic bishops
People from Shkodër
Albanian diplomats
Year of death unknown
Year of birth unknown
Roman Catholic bishops of Lezhë